The following notable Welsh characters have appeared in fictional works.

Novels
Wizard Howl in the fantasy novel Howl's Moving Castle
Gwenog Jones in the fantasy novel Harry Potter

Comics
Marvel characters:
Jessica Jones (although adopted, her adoptive surname, "Jones", is of Welsh origin) 
Pixie (X-Men) (Megan Gwynn).
Damian Tryp (Dafydd ap Andras).
Andras Tryp (Damian's son).
Red dragon ([Female]? & [Male] Gareth Thomas).
Sir Gawain (Dai Thomas).
Stinger (Blodwen Reese).
Doctor Claw (Dafydd ap Rhys).
Arthur Pendragon (Dafydd ap Iorwerth).
Captain Wales (Huw Gruffydd).
Captain Cymru (Morwen Powell).
Captain Prydain (Lloyd Thomas).
Bryn (Bryan Hengist)

Children's books
Fireman Sam a Welsh fire-fighter

Video games
Richard Wesley is a spy in the game Wolfenstein: The Old Blood.
Knight L. Rhys is a soldier of the Brotherhood of Steel Fallout 4 game; his surname suggests he is of Welsh descent.
Lisa Trevor is a test subject at the Umbrella Corporation in Resident Evil. She is a pinnacle character within the story as she helped the corporation create the G-Virus. Her surname suggests that she is of Welsh descent.
Edward Kenway is the protagonist of Assassin's Creed IV: Black Flag. He is voiced by Welsh actor Matt Ryan, and was rewritten to be Welsh following his casting. The character is explicitly referred to as a Welshman from Swansea within the game, with his Cardiff upbringing expanded upon in the games' novelisation. 
Arthur Morgan is the protagonist of Red Dead Redemption 2. He is hinted to be Welsh American: both his forename and surname are of Welsh origin, him confirming his parents "weren't English", his former horse being named "Boadicea", and his grave having a Celtic cross on it.
Nia is a Driver in the game Xenoblade Chronicles 2.

Movies
Larry Talbot, a character in the 1941 film The Wolf Man
Princess Eilonwy, a character in the 1985 film The Black Cauldron

TV shows
Mr. Cheeseman (Dad's Army)
Huw Edwards (EastEnders)
Andy Davidson (Torchwood)
Tom Price (Survivors (1975 TV series))
Rhys Williams (Torchwood)
Sam Peyton-Jones (Sam Tân)

Music

References

Lists of Welsh people
Fictional Welsh people